The 2017 Major League Soccer All-Star Game was the 22nd annual Major League Soccer All-Star Game. The game took place on August 2, 2017 (7:30 p.m. local time) at Soldier Field in Chicago. The game was televised live on Fox Sports 1 and Univision in the United States, and on TSN and TVA Sports in Canada. La Liga side Real Madrid were the opponents. Real Madrid won 4–2 on penalties following a 1–1 draw in normal time.

Borja Mayoral was named MVP.

Squads

MLS All-Stars
Tim Howard, DaMarcus Beasley, Graham Zusi, Greg Garza, Miguel Almirón, Michael Bradley, Kaká, Bastian Schweinsteiger, David Villa, and Nemanja Nikolić were voted to the MLS All-Star Fan XI, announced on July 7, 2017. Sebastian Giovinco was chosen as the FIFA 17 More Than A Vote Winner. Stefan Frei, Jelle van Damme, Hernán Grana, Matt Hedges, Johan Kappelhof, Michael Parkhurst, Dax McCarty, Diego Valeri, Giovani dos Santos, Ignacio Piatti, and Jozy Altidore were selected as coach Veljko Paunović's picks on July 18. Dom Dwyer and Kellyn Acosta were announced as Commissioner Don Garber's picks for the squad.

 (captain)

 Manager:  Veljko Paunović (Chicago Fire)

Notes:
Injured or otherwise unable to play.

Real Madrid
Real Madrid's 26-man United States squad was announced on July 11, 2017. However, Álvaro Morata and Danilo later withdrew from the squad following their transfers to Chelsea and Manchester City, respectively.

 Manager:  Zinedine Zidane

Match

References 

2017
All-Star Game
2010s in Chicago
2017 in Illinois
Sports competitions in Chicago
Soccer in Chicago
August 2017 sports events in the United States
Real Madrid CF matches
2017 in sports in Illinois
Association football penalty shoot-outs